Milyutinskaya is a rural locality (a stanitsa) and the administrative center of Milyutinsky District, Rostov Oblast, Russia. Population:

References

Notes

Sources

Rural localities in Rostov Oblast
Don Host Oblast